Dirceu Francisco Xavier (born December 18, 1977 in Cabo Frio), nicknamed Xavier Dirceu or just Xavier, and sometimes misspelled Xavier Dirção, is a Brazilian football former player lastly played for São Bernardo.

Playing career
He helped Maccabi Haifa to its tenth championship in 2005. Dirceu joined the club as an unknown (from Santo André of Brazil), but quickly became the top defensive midfielder in the Israeli Premier League.

In August 2007, he left Maccabi Haifa and signed for 3 years in Maccabi Petah Tikva, but he left the club after one season and returned to Brazil.

External links
Xavier Dirceu's birthdate

1977 births
Living people
People from Cabo Frio
Brazilian footballers
Maccabi Haifa F.C. players
Maccabi Petah Tikva F.C. players
Expatriate footballers in Israel
Israeli Premier League players
Association football midfielders
Brazilian expatriate sportspeople in Israel
Sportspeople from Rio de Janeiro (state)